Route 406, also known as Codroy Road, is a highway on the western portion of Newfoundland in the Canadian province of Newfoundland and Labrador.  It is a relatively short route, with its eastern terminus at Route 1 (Trans-Canada Highway) in the community of Doyles, and its western terminus at Cape Anguille. The route travels through the scenic Codroy Valley region.

Route description

Route 406 begins at an intersection with Route 1 (Trans-Canada Highway) in Doyles and heads west along the banks of the Codroy River to pass through Upper Ferry, where it has an intersection with a local road leading to Searston and Loch Lomond, as well as cross a bridge over the river. The highway makes a sharp left at an intersection with a local road leading to O'Regan's to follow the northern banks of the river westward through Great Codroy and Millville, where it has an intersection with Route 407 (St. Andrew's-Searston Road). Route 406 begins fill the coastline of the Gulf of St. Lawrence as it heads northwest through Woodville, Codroy, and the community of Cape Anguille, with provincial maintenance coming to shortly after meeting a road to the point of Cape Anguille and the Cape Anguille Lighthouse.

Major intersections

Attractions along Route 406

Cape Anguille Lighthouse

References

406